Peter Platzer (29 May 1910 – 13 December 1959) was an Austrian football goalkeeper who played for Austria in the 1934 FIFA World Cup. He later played two games for Germany. He also played for Brigittenauer AC, Floridsdorfer AC, and FC Admira Wacker Mödling.

References

External links
FIFA profile
rsssf profile

1910 births
1959 deaths
Austrian footballers
Austria international footballers
Association football goalkeepers
FC Admira Wacker Mödling players
1934 FIFA World Cup players
Germany international footballers
German footballers
Dual internationalists (football)